Janildes Fernandes Silva (born 23 August 1980) is a Brazilian road bicycle racer. She competed at the 2012 Summer Olympics in the Women's road race, but failed to finish, having finished in 49th and 54th at the 2000 and 2004 Summer Olympics respectively. In 2015, she won the Tour Femenino de San Luis.

Major results

1998
 1st Prova Ciclística 9 de Julho
1999
 1st Prova Ciclística 9 de Julho
 Pan American Games
3rd  Road race
9th Time trial
2000
 1st Prova Ciclística 9 de Julho
2002
 3rd  Road race, Pan American Road Championships
2003
 1st Copa América de Ciclismo
 Pan American Games
2nd  Road race
8th Time trial
2004
 1st Copa da Republica de Ciclismo
2005
 3rd Copa América de Ciclismo
2006
 2nd  Road race, South American Games
 5th Copa América de Ciclismo
 7th Overall Novilon Internationale Damesronde van Drenthe
 9th GP Liberazione
2007
 National Road Championships
1st  Time trial
2nd Road race
 Pan American Road and Track Championships
3rd  Scratch
5th Road race
2008
 1st Copa da Republica de Ciclismo
 Vuelta a El Salvador
1st Points classification
1st Stage 3
 3rd Time trial, National Road Championships
 4th Copa América de Ciclismo
 6th Road race, Pan American Road Championships
2009
 1st  Road race, National Road Championships
 1st Copa América de Ciclismo
 4th Road race, Pan American Road Championships
2010
 1st  Road race, National Road Championships
 South American Games
2nd  Individual pursuit
3rd  Scratch
3rd  Team pursuit
2011
 National Road Championships
2nd Road race
3rd Time trial
2012
 1st Copa Federacion Venezolana de Ciclismo Corre por la Vida
 3rd  Road race, Pan American Road Championships
2014
 National Track Championships
1st  Omnium
1st  Scratch
 3rd Time trial, National Road Championships
 10th Road race, Pan American Road Championships
2015
 Military World Games
1st  Team road race
3rd  Road race
 1st  Overall Tour Femenino de San Luis
 4th Gran Prix San Luis Femenino
 7th Road race, Pan American Road Championships
2016
 1st Copa Federación Venezolana de Ciclismo
 9th Clasico FVCiclismo Corre Por la VIDA
2019
 7th Overall Tour Femenino de Venezuela II

References

External links

 
 
 

Brazilian female cyclists
Brazilian road racing cyclists
1980 births
Living people
Olympic cyclists of Brazil
Cyclists at the 2000 Summer Olympics
Cyclists at the 2003 Pan American Games
Cyclists at the 2004 Summer Olympics
Cyclists at the 2012 Summer Olympics
Sportspeople from Mato Grosso
Cyclists at the 2015 Pan American Games
Pan American Games silver medalists for Brazil
Pan American Games medalists in cycling
South American Games silver medalists for Brazil
South American Games bronze medalists for Brazil
South American Games medalists in cycling
Competitors at the 2010 South American Games
Medalists at the 2003 Pan American Games
20th-century Brazilian women
21st-century Brazilian women